Sportclub Brühl St. Gallen is a football club based in St. Gallen, Switzerland, that competes in the Swiss Promotion League, the third tier of Swiss football. In 1915, the club became Swiss champions and is the club's only major honour to date.

Players

Current squad
As of 31 December 2022.

Staff and board members
 Trainer:  Denis Sonderegger
 Assistant Trainer: Alex DeFreitas
 Assistant Trainer: Pietro Minneci
 Goalkeeper Coach: Daniel Manser
 Fitness Coach: Marcel Alder

Honours
Swiss Serie A
Champions: 1914–15

External links
 Official Site

Association football clubs established in 1901
Football clubs in Switzerland
SC Bruhl
SC Bruhl